Carnforth High School is a coeducational secondary school located in Carnforth, Lancashire, England. The school previously held specialist Science College status.

Carnforth High School offers its sixth form courses as part of the North Lancashire Learning Partnership which also includes Central Lancaster High School, and Our Lady's Catholic College.

Previously a community school administered by Lancashire County Council, in June 2018 Carnforth High School converted to academy status. The school is now sponsored by The Bay Learning Trust.

References

External links
School website

Schools in the City of Lancaster
Secondary schools in Lancashire
Academies in Lancashire
Carnforth
1959 establishments in England
Educational institutions established in 1959